Gandhi is a 1982 period biographical film based on the life of Mahatma Gandhi, the leader of nonviolent non-cooperative Indian independence movement against the British Empire during the 20th century. A co-production between India and the United Kingdom, it is directed and produced by Richard Attenborough from a screenplay written by John Briley. It stars Ben Kingsley in the title role. The film covers Gandhi's life from a defining moment in 1893, as he is thrown off from a South African train for being in a whites-only compartment and concludes with his assassination and funeral in 1948. Although a practising Hindu, Gandhi's embracing of other faiths, particularly Christianity and Islam, is also depicted.

Gandhi was released by Columbia Pictures in India on 30 November 1982, in the United Kingdom on 3 December, and in the United States on 8 December. It was praised for providing a historically accurate portrayal of the life of Gandhi, the Indian independence movement and the deteriorating results of British colonisation on India, and its production values, costume design, and Kingsley's performance received worldwide critical acclaim. It became a commercial success, grossing $127.8 million on a $22 million budget.

The film received a leading eleven nominations at the 55th Academy Awards, winning eight (more than any other film nominated that year), including those for the Best Picture, Best Director, and Best Actor (for Kingsley). The film was screened retrospectively on 12 August 2016 as the opening film at the Independence Day Film Festival jointly presented by the Indian Directorate of Film Festivals and Ministry of Defence, commemorating the 70th Indian Independence Day. The British Film Institute ranked it as the 34th greatest British film of the 20th century.

Plot
On 30 January 1948, on his way to an evening prayer service, an elderly Gandhi is helped out for his evening walk to meet a large number of greeters and admirers. One visitor, Nathuram Godse, shoots him point blank in the chest. His state funeral is shown, the procession attended by millions of people from all walks of life, with a radio reporter speaking eloquently about Gandhi's world-changing life and works.

In June 1893, the 23-year-old Gandhi is thrown off from a South African train for being an Indian sitting in a first-class compartment, despite his having a first-class ticket. Realising the laws are biased even against well-educated and successful Indians, he then decides to start a non-violent protest campaign for the rights of all Indians in South Africa, arguing that they are British subjects and entitled to the same rights and privileges as whites. After numerous arrests and unwelcome international attention, the government finally relents by recognising some rights for Indians.

In 1915, as a result of his victory in South Africa, Gandhi is invited back to India, where he is now considered something of a national hero. He is urged to take up the fight for India's independence (Swaraj, Quit India) from the British Empire. Gandhi agrees, and mounts a non-violent non-cooperation campaign of unprecedented scale, coordinating millions of Indians nationwide. There are some setbacks, such as violence against the protesters or by the protesters themselves, Gandhi's occasional imprisonment, and the 1919 Jallianwala Bagh massacre in Amritsar.

Nevertheless, the campaign generates great attention, and Britain faces intense public pressure. In 1930, Gandhi protests against the British-imposed salt tax via a highly symbolic Salt March. He also travels to London for a conference concerning Britain's possible departure from India; this, however, proves fruitless. Gandhi spends much of the Second World War in prison for not supporting the war. During a period under house arrest, his wife dies. After the war ends, India finally wins its independence. Indians celebrate this victory, but their troubles are far from over. The country is subsequently partitioned by religion. It is decided that the northwest area and the eastern part of India (current-day Bangladesh), both places where Muslims are in the majority, will become a new country called Pakistan. It is hoped that by permitting the Muslims to live in a separate country, violence will abate. Gandhi is opposed to the idea and is even willing to allow Muhammad Ali Jinnah to become the first Prime Minister of India, but the Partition of India is carried out nevertheless. Religious tensions between Hindus and Muslims erupt into nationwide violence. Repulsed by this sudden unrest, Gandhi declares a hunger strike, in which he will not eat until the fighting stops. The fighting does stop eventually.

Gandhi spends his last days trying to bring about peace between both nations. He, thereby, angers many dissidents on both sides, one of whom (Godse) is involved in a conspiracy to assassinate him. Gandhi is cremated and his ashes are scattered on the holy Ganga. As this happens, viewers hear Gandhi in another voiceover from earlier in the film.

Cast

Production
This film had been Richard Attenborough's dream project, although two previous attempts at filming had failed. In 1952, Gabriel Pascal secured an agreement with the Prime Minister of India (Jawaharlal Nehru) to produce a film of Gandhi's life. However, Pascal died in 1954 before preparations were completed.

In 1962 Attenborough was contacted by Motilal Kothari, an Indian-born civil servant working with the Indian High Commission in London and a devout follower of Gandhi. Kothari insisted that Attenborough meet him to discuss a film about Gandhi. Attenborough agreed, after reading Louis Fischer's biography of Gandhi and spent the next 18 years attempting to get the film made. He was able to meet prime minister Nehru and his daughter Indira Gandhi through a connection with Lord Louis Mountbatten, the last Viceroy of India. Nehru approved of the film and promised to help support its production, but his death in 1964 was one of the film's many setbacks. Attenborough would dedicate the film to the memory of Kothari, Mountbatten, and Nehru.

David Lean and Sam Spiegel had planned to make a film about Gandhi after completing The Bridge on the River Kwai, reportedly with Alec Guinness as Gandhi. Ultimately, the project was abandoned in favour of Lawrence of Arabia (1962). Attenborough reluctantly approached Lean with his own Gandhi project in the late 1960s, and Lean agreed to direct the film and offered Attenborough the lead role. Instead Lean began filming Ryan's Daughter, during which time Motilai Kothari had died and the project fell apart.

Attenborough again attempted to resurrect the project in 1976 with backing from Warner Brothers. Then prime minister Indira Gandhi declared a state of emergency in India and shooting would be impossible. Co-producer Rani Dube persuaded prime minister Indira Gandhi to provide the first $10 million from the National Film Development Corporation of India, chaired by D. V. S. Raju at that time, on the back of which the remainder of the funding was finally raised. Finally in 1980 Attenborough was able to secure the remainder of the funding needed to make the film. Screenwriter John Briley had introduced him to Jake Eberts, the chief executive at the new Goldcrest production company that raised approximately two-thirds of the film's budget.

Shooting began on 26 November 1980 and ended on 10 May 1981. Some scenes were shot near Koilwar Bridge, in Bihar. Over 300,000 extras were used in the funeral scene, the most for any film, according to Guinness World Records.

Casting
During pre-production, there was much speculation as to who would play the role of Gandhi. The choice was Ben Kingsley, who is partly of Indian heritage (his father was Gujarati and his birth name is Krishna Bhanji).

Release
Gandhi premiered in New Delhi, India on 30 November 1982. Two days later, on 2 December, it had a Royal Premiere at the Odeon Leicester Square in London in the presence of Prince Charles and Princess Diana before opening to the public the following day. The film had a limited release in the US starting on Wednesday, 8 December 1982, followed by a wider release in January 1983. In February 1983 it opened on two screens in India as well as opening nationwide in the UK and expanding into other countries.

Reception

Critical response
Reviews were broadly positive not only in India but also internationally. The film was discussed or reviewed in Newsweek, Time, the Washington Post, The Public Historian, Cross Currents, The Journal of Asian Studies, Film Quarterly, The Progressive, The Christian Century and elsewhere. Ben Kingsley's performance was especially praised. Among the few who took a more negative view of the film, historian Lawrence James called it "pure hagiography" while anthropologist Akhil Gupta said it "suffers from tepid direction and a superficial and misleading interpretation of history." Also Indian novelist Makarand R. Paranjape has written that "Gandhi, though hagiographical, follow a mimetic style of film-making in which cinema, the visual image itself, is supposed to portray or reflect 'reality'". The film was also criticised by some right-wing commentators who objected to the film's advocacy of nonviolence, including Pat Buchanan, Emmett Tyrrell, and especially Richard Grenier. In Time, Richard Schickel wrote that in portraying Gandhi's "spiritual presence... Kingsley is nothing short of astonishing." A "singular virtue" of the film is that "its title figure is also a character in the usual dramatic sense of the term." Schickel viewed Attenborough's directorial style as having "a conventional handsomeness that is more predictable than enlivening," but this "stylistic self-denial serves to keep one's attention fastened where it belongs: on a persuasive, if perhaps debatable vision of Gandhi's spirit, and on the remarkable actor who has caught its light in all its seasons."  Roger Ebert gave the film four stars and called it a "remarkable experience", and placed it 5th on his 10 best films of 1983.

In Newsweek, Jack Kroll stated that "There are very few movies that absolutely must be seen. Sir Richard Attenborough's Gandhi is one of them." The movie "deals with a subject of great importance... with a mixture of high intelligence and immediate emotional impact... [and] Ben Kingsley... gives what is possibly the most astonishing biographical performance in screen history." Kroll stated that the screenplay's "least persuasive characters are Gandhi's Western allies and acolytes" such as an English cleric and an American journalist, but that "Attenborough's 'old-fashioned' style is exactly right for the no-tricks, no-phony-psychologizing quality he wants." Furthermore, Attenborough
mounts a powerful challenge to his audience by presenting Gandhi as the most profound and effective of revolutionaries, creating out of a fierce personal discipline a chain reaction that led to tremendous historical consequences. At a time of deep political unrest, economic dislocation and nuclear anxiety, seeing "Gandhi" is an experience that will change many minds and hearts.

According to the Museum of Broadcast Communications there was "a cycle of film and television productions which emerged during the first half of the 1980s, which seemed to indicate Britain's growing preoccupation with India, Empire and a particular aspect of British cultural history". In addition to Gandhi, this cycle also included Heat and Dust (1983), Octopussy (1983), The Jewel in the Crown (1984), The Far Pavilions (1984) and A Passage to India (1984).

Patrick French negatively reviewed the film, writing in The Telegraph:
An important origin of one myth about Gandhi was Richard Attenborough's 1982 film. Take the episode when the newly arrived Gandhi is ejected from a first-class railway carriage at Pietermaritzburg after a white passenger objects to sharing space with a "coolie" (an Indian indentured labourer). In fact, Gandhi's demand to be allowed to travel first-class was accepted by the railway company. Rather than marking the start of a campaign against racial oppression, as legend has it, this episode was the start of a campaign to extend racial segregation in South Africa. Gandhi was adamant that "respectable Indians" should not be obliged to use the same facilities as "raw Kaffirs". He petitioned the authorities in the port city of Durban, where he practised law, to end the indignity of making Indians use the same entrance to the post office as blacks, and counted it a victory when three doors were introduced: one for Europeans, one for Asiatics and one for Natives.

Richard Grenier in his 1983 article, "The Gandhi Nobody Knows", which was also the title of the book of the same name and topic, also criticised the film, arguing it misportrayed him as a "saint". He also alleged the Indian government admitted to financing about a third of the film's budget. Grenier's book later became an inspiration for G. B. Singh's book Gandhi: Behind the Mask of Divinity. Parts of the book also discuss the film negatively.

In the DVD edition of the 1998 film Jinnah, the director's commentary of the film makes mention of the 1982 film. In the commentary, both Sir Christopher Lee, who portrayed the older Muhammed Ali Jinnah, and director Jamil Dehlavi criticised the film Gandhi for its portrayal of Jinnah, arguing it to be demonising and historically inaccurate.

One notable person, Mark Boyle (better known as "The Moneyless Man") has stated that watching the film was the moment that changed his life and said that after that, he took Mahatma Gandhi's message of peace and non-violence to heart and that the film inspired him to become an activist.

Review aggregator website Rotten Tomatoes retrospectively collected 108 reviews and judged 89% of them to be positive, with an average rating of 8.30/10. The website's critical consensus reads: "Director Richard Attenborough is typically sympathetic and sure-handed, but it's Ben Kingsley's magnetic performance that acts as the linchpin for this sprawling, lengthy biopic." Metacritic gave the film a score of 79 out of 100 based on 16 critical reviews, indicating "generally favorable reviews". CinemaScore reported that audiences gave the film a rare "A+" grade. In 2010, the Independent Film & Television Alliance selected the film as one of the 30 Most Significant Independent Films of the last 30 years.

Box office
The film grossed $81,917 in its first 6 days at the Odeon Leicester Square in London. In the United States and Canada, it grossed $183,583 in its first 5 days from 4 theatres (Ziegfeld Theatre in New York City; Uptown Theater in Washington D.C.; Century Plaza in Los Angeles; and the York in Toronto). Due to the running time, it could be shown only three times a day. It went on to gross  in the United States and Canada, the 12th highest-grossing film of 1982.

Outside of the United States and Canada, the film grossed  in the rest of the world, the third highest for the year.

In the United Kingdom, the film grossed  ( adjusted for inflation). It is one of the top ten highest-grossing British independent films of all time adjusted for inflation.

It was shown tax free in Bombay (known as Mumbai since 1995) and Delhi.

The film grossed a total of  worldwide. Goldcrest Films invested £5,076,000 in the film and received £11,461,000 in return, earning them a profit of £6,385,000.

Accolades

See also
 BFI Top 100 British films
 List of artistic depictions of Mahatma Gandhi
 List of Indian winners and nominees of the Academy Awards
 List of historical films set in Asia

References

Further reading 
 Attenborough, Richard. In Search of Gandhi (1982), memoir on making the film
 Hay, Stephen. "Attenborough's 'Gandhi,'" The Public Historian, 5#3 (1983), pp. 84–94 in JSTOR; evaluates the film's historical accuracy and finds it mixed in the first half of the film and good in the second half

External links

 
 
 
 
 Gallery of photos from the set of Gandhi at BAFTA.org

1980s biographical drama films
1980s British films
1980s English-language films
1980s Hindi-language films
1982 drama films
1982 films
Apartheid films
Cultural depictions of Indian men
Best Film BAFTA Award winners
Best Foreign Language Film Golden Globe winners
Best Picture Academy Award winners
British biographical drama films
British epic films
British historical films
British Indian films
British World War II films
Cultural depictions of Jawaharlal Nehru
Cultural depictions of Louis Mountbatten, 1st Earl Mountbatten of Burma
Cultural depictions of Mahatma Gandhi
Cultural depictions of Muhammad Ali Jinnah
Cultural depictions of Vallabhbhai Patel
English-language Indian films
Epic films based on actual events
Films about Mahatma Gandhi
Films directed by Richard Attenborough
Films featuring a Best Actor Academy Award-winning performance
Films featuring a Best Drama Actor Golden Globe winning performance
Films produced by Richard Attenborough
Films scored by George Fenton
Films scored by Ravi Shankar
Films set in 1893
Films set in 1910
Films set in 1922
Films set in 1931
Films set in 1940
Films set in 1947
Films set in 1948
Films set in England
Films set in India
Films set in London
Films set in South Africa
Films set in the British Empire
Films set in the British Raj
Golden Globe Award winners
Films set in the Indian independence movement
Films set in the partition of India
Films shot in Bihar
Films shot in India
Films that won the Best Costume Design Academy Award
Films whose art director won the Best Art Direction Academy Award
Films whose cinematographer won the Best Cinematography Academy Award
Films whose director won the Best Directing Academy Award
Films whose director won the Best Direction BAFTA Award
Films whose director won the Best Director Golden Globe
Films whose editor won the Best Film Editing Academy Award
Films whose writer won the Best Original Screenplay Academy Award
Films with screenplays by John Briley
Goldcrest Films films
Indian biographical drama films
Rail transport films